This is a list of species in Hypera, a genus of clover and alfalfa weevils in the family Curculionidae.

Hypera species

 Hypera abrutiana Desbr., 1903-04 c
 Hypera acetosae Dejean, 1821 c
 Hypera aequabilis Marshall, 1934 c
 Hypera albonotata Pic, 1925 c
 Hypera albosquamosa Pic, 1904 c
 Hypera alternans Dejean, 1821 c
 Hypera amalek Petri, 1901 c
 Hypera amasiensis Faust, 1890 c
 Hypera amoena Sturm, 1826 c
 Hypera angustula Reitter, 1915 c
 Hypera anjumanensis Voss, 1963 c
 Hypera antiqua Giebel, C.G., 1856 c g
 Hypera arator (Linnaeus, C., 1758) c g
 Hypera arnoldii Zaslavskij, 1967 c
 Hypera arundinis (Paykull, G. de, 1792) c g
 Hypera arvernica Cap., 1867 c
 Hypera aubei Cap., 1867 c
 Hypera audax Faust, 1887 c
 Hypera auliensis Petri, 1901 c
 Hypera auriflua Waltl, 1835 c
 Hypera austera Boh. in Schoenh., 1834 c
 Hypera austriaca Dejean, 1821 c
 Hypera avernica Petri, 1901 c
 Hypera barnevillei Cap., 1868 c
 Hypera barrosi Petri, 1901 c
 Hypera bawosi E. Guér., 1894 c
 Hypera bidentata Champion, 1918 c
 Hypera biglobosa Kirsch, 1880 c
 Hypera biharica Petri, 1901 c
 Hypera bipunctata Germar, E.F., 1821 c
 Hypera bonvouloiri Cap., 1867 c
 Hypera borealis Krausse, 1900 c
 Hypera bosnica Petri, 1901 c
 Hypera bravardi Pic, 1925 c
 Hypera brucki Cap., 1867 c
 Hypera brunnipennis (Boheman, 1834) i b  (Egyptian alfalfa weevil)
 Hypera bucovinensis Penecke, 1928 c
 Hypera budensis Sturm, 1826 c
 Hypera bulgarica Kippenberg, 1986 c
 Hypera caliginosa Dejean, c
 Hypera callosa Petri, 1901 c
 Hypera canescens Stephens, 1829 c
 Hypera capiomonti Petri, 1901 c
 Hypera carinicollis Petri, 1901 c
 Hypera carpathica Petri, 1901 c
 Hypera castor (LeConte, 1876) i g
 Hypera caucasica Faust, 1887 c
 Hypera chevrolati Cap., 1868 c
 Hypera chlorocoma Boh. in Schoenh., 1842 c
 Hypera circassicola Reitt., 1888 c
 Hypera coarcticollis Krauss, 1900 c
 Hypera comata Dejean, 1821 c
 Hypera compta (Say, 1831) i b
 Hypera conmaculata (Herbst, J.F.W., 1795) c g
 Hypera constans Dejean, 1821 c
 Hypera contaminata (Herbst, J.F.W., 1795) c g
 Hypera corcyrea Faust, 1887 c
 Hypera cordicollis Petri, 1901 c
 Hypera corrosa Desbr., 1899-1900 c
 Hypera crinita Dejean, 1821 c
 Hypera croatica Dejean, 1821 c
 Hypera curtirostris Pic, 1941 c
 Hypera curtithorax Pic, 1925 c
 Hypera cypris Reiche & Saulcy, 1857 c
 Hypera cyrta Germar, E.F., 1821 c
 Hypera damascena Stierl., 1888 c
 Hypera dauci Dejean, 1821 c
 Hypera delarouzei Cap., 1868 c
 Hypera deportata Boh. in Schoenh., 1842 c
 Hypera deserta (Panzer, G.W.F., 1796) c g
 Hypera deyrollei Cap., 1868 c
 Hypera dissimilis Germar, E.F., 1821 c
 Hypera distinguenda Dejean, c
 Hypera diversa Dejean, c
 Hypera diversipunctata (Schrank, 1798) i c g b
 Hypera dorica Petri, 1901 c
 Hypera dorsalis Sturm, 1826 c
 Hypera dubia Cap., 1868 c
 Hypera dubitabilis Hustache, 1946 c
 Hypera duplopunctata Petri, 1901 c
 Hypera educta Tempère, 1972 c
 Hypera elegans Sturm, 1826 c
 Hypera elongata Dejean, 1821 c
 Hypera eos Suvorov, 1912 c
 Hypera eximia (LeConte, 1876) i g
 Hypera fabae Hoffmann, 1942 c
 Hypera fairmairei Cap., 1868 c
 Hypera fasciculata Germar, E.F., 1821 c
 Hypera fauconneti Pic, 1925 c
 Hypera fausti Petri, 1901 c
 Hypera favarcqui Pic, 1925 c
 Hypera fiumana Petri, 1901 c
 Hypera flavicans Dejean, 1821 c
 Hypera folwacznyi Dieckmann, 1975 c
 Hypera fulvipes Stephens, 1829 c
 Hypera fumipes Curtis, 1837 c
 Hypera fuscocinerea (Marsham, 1802) g
 Hypera ganglbaueri Petri, 1901 c
 Hypera gemina Zaslavskij, 1967 c
 Hypera glacialis Lomnicki, 1894 c
 Hypera globosa Dejean, 1821 c
 Hypera gordiaea Petri, 1901 c
 Hypera gracilenta Skuhrovec, 2012 c
 Hypera gravida Dejean, 1821 c
 Hypera grisea Dejean, 1821 c
 Hypera grouvellei Hustache, 1929 c
 Hypera guttipes Cap., 1868 c
 Hypera helwigii Ziegler, c
 Hypera hierichontica Cap., 1868 c
 Hypera hispidula Dejean, 1821 c
 Hypera hostilis Ziegler, c
 Hypera humilis Dejean, c
 Hypera iberica Cap., 1868 c
 Hypera idriensis Dahl, 1825 c
 Hypera imbecilla Faust, 1886 c
 Hypera insubida Germar, c
 Hypera insularis Cap., 1867 c
 Hypera integrisquamis Voss, 1967 c
 Hypera johanni Reitt., 1896 c
 Hypera judaica Petri, 1901 c
 Hypera juvenca Motsch., 1859-1860 c
 Hypera kayali Skuhrovec, 2006 c
 Hypera kopalensis Suvorov, 1912 c
 Hypera korbi Petri, 1901 c
 Hypera kraatzi Cap., 1867 c
 Hypera kunzii Germar, 1822 c
 Hypera latifrons Petri, 1901 c
 Hypera leonisi Pic, 1925 c
 Hypera lhostei Hoffmann, 1938 c
 Hypera libanica Pic, 1914 c
 Hypera lindbergi Hoffmann, 1957 c
 Hypera lineata Stephens, 1829 c
 Hypera lineola Sturm, 1826 c
 Hypera litigiosa Dejean, 1830 c
 Hypera longicollis Petri, 1901 c
 Hypera longior Pic, 1941 c
 Hypera lucasi Cap., 1867 c
 Hypera lukjanovitshi Zaslavskij, 1964 c
 Hypera lunata Titus, 1911 c
 Hypera lurida Cristofori & Jan, 1832 c
 Hypera lusitanica Cap., 1868 c
 Hypera lydia Petri, 1901 c
 Hypera maculata W. Redt., 1842 c
 Hypera maculipennis Dejean, 1821 c
 Hypera maculosa Dejean, 1821 c
 Hypera maritima (Titus, 1911) i
 Hypera marmorata Cap., 1867 c
 Hypera marmottani Cap., 1868 c
 Hypera mauritanica Cap., 1868 c
 Hypera medicaginis Marshall, 1913 c
 Hypera mehadiensis Sturm, 1826 c
 Hypera melancholica (Fabricius, J.C., 1792) c g
 Hypera melarhyncha Germar, E.F., 1821 c
 Hypera meles (Fabricius, 1792) i c g b  (clover head weevil)
 Hypera meridionalis Villa & Villa, 1835 c
 Hypera micans Sturm, 186- c
 Hypera miles Stephens, 1829 c
 Hypera minuta Petri, 1901 c
 Hypera mixta Dejean, 1821 c
 Hypera mniszechi Cap., 1867 c
 Hypera moczarskii Penecke, 1936 c
 Hypera montivaga Cap., 1868 c
 Hypera multifida Israelson, 1984 c
 Hypera murina Dejean, 1821 c
 Hypera mutabilis Germar, E.F., 1821 c
 Hypera mutatoria Faust, 1887 c
 Hypera nebulosa Stephens, 1831 c
 Hypera nigrescens Suvorov, 1912 c
 Hypera nigrirostris (Fabricius, 1775) i c g b  (black-beaked green weevil)
 Hypera nivosa Petri, 1901 c
 Hypera normandi Hoffmann, 1957 c
 Hypera noscibilis Faust, 1890 c
 Hypera noscidia Faust, 1889 c
 Hypera obscura Cap., 1867 c
 Hypera obtusa Rosh., 1856 c
 Hypera ocellata Champion, 1902-04 c
 Hypera okeni Gistl, J., 1835 c
 Hypera ononidis (Chevrolat, 1863) g
 Hypera ophthalmica Desbr., 1898-99 c
 Hypera orientalis Cap., 1867 c
 Hypera ornata (Capiomont, 1864) g
 Hypera ovalis Boh. in Schoenh., 1842 c
 Hypera oxalidis Smreczynski, 1926 c
 Hypera oxalis Dejean, 1821 c
 Hypera pallida Dejean, 1821 c
 Hypera paludicola Warner, 1973 i c
 Hypera palumbaria Germar, E.F., 1821 c
 Hypera palustris Stephens, 1831 c
 Hypera pantherina Cap., 1867 c
 Hypera parallela Dejean, 1821 c
 Hypera pastinacae (Rossi, P., 1790) c g
 Hypera pedestris Dejean, 1821 c
 Hypera perplexa Cap., 1868 c
 Hypera perrisi Cap., 1868 c
 Hypera petrii Desbr., 1908 c
 Hypera phaeopa Stephens, 1829 c
 Hypera philanthus Dejean, 1821 c
 Hypera picicornis Stephens, 1831 c
 Hypera picipes Curtis, 1826 c
 Hypera pimpinellae Fischer de Waldheim, 1830 c
 Hypera plantaginis (DeGeer, C., 1775) c g
 Hypera plochardi Cap., 1868 c
 Hypera pollux Germar, E.F., 1821 c
 Hypera polygoni Germar, 1817 c
 Hypera porcella Cap., 1868 c
 Hypera postica (Gyllenhal, 1813) i c g b  (alfalfa weevil)
 Hypera praecomata Lomnicki, 1894 c
 Hypera proxima Cap., 1875 c
 Hypera pruinosa Suvorov, 1912 c
 Hypera przewalskii Suvorov, 1912 c
 Hypera pseudotenuirostris Skuhrovec & Winkelmann, 2008 c
 Hypera pubescens Ziegler, c
 Hypera pubicollis (LeConte, 1876) i g
 Hypera punctata (Fabricius, 1775) i c
 Hypera puncticauda Motsch. in Schrenck, 1860 c
 Hypera punctulata Dejean, 1821 c
 Hypera pusilla Petri, 1912 c
 Hypera pustulata (Frivaldszky, 1884) g
 Hypera pyrenaea Cap., 1867 c
 Hypera pyrrhodactylus Stephens, 1829 c
 Hypera quadratocollis Petri, 1901 c
 Hypera quadricollis (LeConte, 1876) i g
 Hypera reductirostris Pic, 1925 c
 Hypera reichei Cap., 1868 c
 Hypera reitteri Faust, 1887 c
 Hypera repanda Germar, E.F., 1821 c
 Hypera rotundata Cap., 1867 c
 Hypera rubi Krauss, 1900 c
 Hypera rudicollis Cap., 1868 c
 Hypera rufimembris Pic, 1925 c
 Hypera rufipes Stephens, 1829 c
 Hypera rugulosa Petri, 1901 c
 Hypera rumicis (Linnaeus, 1758) i c b
 Hypera saulcyi Cap., 1867 c
 Hypera scanica Germar, 1817 c
 Hypera scapularis Chevr., 1860 c
 Hypera segnis Cap., 1867 c
 Hypera seigneurici Tempère, 1984 c
 Hypera septentrionalis Kippenberg, 1986 c
 Hypera seriata (Mannerheim, 1853) i g
 Hypera siccensis Thompson, 2006 c
 Hypera sierrana Cap., 1868 c
 Hypera signata Grimmer, K.H.B., 1841 c
 Hypera socialis Boh. in Schoenh., 1842 c
 Hypera solida Petri, 1901 c
 Hypera sordida Dejean, c
 Hypera souvorovi Fleisch., 1909 c
 Hypera spissa Boh. in Schoenh., 1842 c
 Hypera straminea Stephens, 1829 c
 Hypera striata Sturm, 1826 c
 Hypera stulta Faust, 1883 c
 Hypera suanetica Petri, 1901 c
 Hypera subfasciculata Zaslavskij, 1967 c
 Hypera sublineata Curtis, 1826 c
 Hypera subuniformis Pic, 1914 c
 Hypera sushkini Zaslavskij, 1979 c
 Hypera suspiciosa Germar, E.F., 1821 c
 Hypera swanetica Faust, 1887 c
 Hypera tamarisci Dejean, 1821 c
 Hypera taraxaci Dahl, c
 Hypera taurica Zaslavskij, 1967 c
 Hypera temperei Hoffmann, 1958 c
 Hypera tesselata Dejean, 1821 c
 Hypera tigrina Waltl, 1835 c
 Hypera timida Dejean, 1830 c
 Hypera trifolii Dejean, 1821 c
 Hypera tristis Cristofori & Jan, 1832 c
 Hypera trivittata (Say, 1831) i g
 Hypera tumida Dejean, 1821 c
 Hypera variabilis Sturm, 1826 c
 Hypera venusta (Fabricius, J.C., 1781) c g
 Hypera viciae Stephens, 1831 c
 Hypera vicina Cristofori & Jan, 1832 c
 Hypera vidua Gené, 1837 c
 Hypera viennensis Sturm, c
 Hypera villosula Curtis, 1826 c
 Hypera virescens Petri, 1901 c
 Hypera visnagae Cap., 1868 c

Data sources: i = ITIS, c = Catalogue of Life, g = GBIF, b = Bugguide.net

References

Hypera
Articles created by Qbugbot